Tiên Du is a rural district of Bắc Ninh province in the Red River Delta region of Vietnam. As of 2003, the district had a population of 131,118. The district covers an area of 108 km². The district capital lies at Lim.

Among local spirits traditionally worshipped is Thái Giám, a eunuch spirit.

References

Districts of Bắc Ninh province